Ommadawn is the third studio album by English musician, multi-instrumentalist and songwriter Mike Oldfield, released on 25 October 1975 on Virgin Records.

Ommadawn peaked at No. 4 on the UK Albums Chart, No. 74 in Canada, and No. 146 on the US Billboard 200. The song that concludes "Ommadawn (Part Two)", entitled "On Horseback", was released as a single in November 1975 with Oldfield's non-album track "In Dulci Jubilo". The album reached gold certification by the British Phonographic Industry within two months, signifying 100,000 copies sold. In 2010, Mercury Records issued a remastered edition containing new stereo and 5.1 surround sound mixes by Oldfield and extra material. Oldfield had wanted to make Amarok (1990) a sequel album to Ommadawn, but the idea was not realised until he released Return to Ommadawn (2017).

Background and recording
By the end of 1974, Oldfield had been propelled to worldwide fame due to the unexpected critical and commercial success of his debut studio album, Tubular Bells (1973). He followed it with Hergest Ridge (1974), which generated a more negative critical reaction in comparison, which disappointed him but led to a creative period as he vowed to deliver a follow-up that was "worthwhile and successful", proving he was not a one-hit wonder with the success of Tubular Bells. When Oldfield started to work on new music for Ommadawn, he wanted to avoid professional studios and persuaded his label, Virgin Records, to install a 24-track studio at The Beacon, his home in Kington, Herefordshire. Oldfield recorded Ommadawn at The Beacon between January and September 1975; the African drums were recorded at The Manor in Shipton-on-Cherwell, Oxfordshire, where Oldfield had recorded Tubular Bells and Hergest Ridge. The Manor was chosen as there was insufficient space at The Beacon to accommodate the instruments and equipment. Oldfield is credited as the album's sole producer and engineer.

Shortly after Oldfield started to record, his mother died. He later recalled that working on his new music provided the only source of comfort for him at the time. He faced further problems several months in when he had almost finished recording side one, when the recording tape started to shed its oxide layer, causing irreparable damage. Virgin delivered a machine so that copies of the master tape could be made and Oldfield could carry on working, but the same problem occurred on the new tape. This left Oldfield no choice but to start again using a new brand of tape. He believed that the many overdubs he had put down on the track had worn it out. Oldfield felt depressed to start over at first, but he then noticed that "something clicked inside of me" and realised that his previous takes had become good practice for the final ones. "All the musical pieces fell into place and the results sounded marvellous." The original version of side one was released on the 2010 remaster as "Ommadawn (Lost Version)". Excerpts from the scrapped version were previously used in Oldfield's interview on Tony Palmer's documentary series All You Need is Love and the 1977 film Reflection.

The cover photograph was taken by David Bailey. The album's title came about at the end of its production. Oldfield spotted a collection of words that Irish musician Clodagh Simonds had made up, one of them being , and decided to use it. Later, however, he said it did mean "idiot."

Music
As with Oldfield's first two albums, Ommadawn is a single same-titled composition divided into Part One and Part Two, each designated to a single side of the LP. "Ommadawn (Part One)" has a length of 19:23 and "Ommadawn (Part Two)" runs for 17:17. The latter ends with a song entitled "On Horseback", written by Oldfield and lyrics by Oldfield and William Murray and, while it was banded separately on vinyl from "Ommadawn (Part Two)", it was only referred to as "the horse song" in the liner notes, only properly credited by name on it accompanying single and on remastered copies of the album released from the 2010s onward. The song relates to Oldfield, Murray, and Leslie Penning's time riding ponies around Hergest Ridge.

Most of the instruments that Oldfield played on the album are shown in a photograph featured on his compilation set Boxed (1976).

Album title and lyrics 
In his autobiography, Changeling, Oldfield states that he just wanted "sounds", not "sensible" lyrics. He asked Clodagh Simonds, an Irish musician with whom he was working, to come up with something in Irish. She wrote down the first words that came into her head:

Daddy's in bed, The cat's drinking milk, I'm an idiot, And I'm laughing.

Oldfield states that Simonds had telephoned a relative or friend to translate these words into Irish for the song. The final lyrics included with the album are:

These lyrics are written in an English-based respelling system, but all four lines are easily recognisable as an Irish translation of the English words, although the first two lines have undergone a process of partial scrambler: combinations of vowel + semivowel are kept intact, but otherwise the lines are written backwards (so, e.g.,  corresponds to ) and some word spaces have been changed. In standard Irish orthography, the lyrics are (with English translation, since the translation does not match the original exactly):

The word idiot ( in Irish) was Anglicised into Ommadawn and used as the title of the album.

Release

Ommadawn was released on 25 October 1975.

In November 1975, Oldfield's non-album track "In Dulci Jubilo" was released with "On Horseback" on the B-side. It went on to peak at No. 4 on the UK Singles Chart in January 1976.

In 1976, a SQ quadraphonic mix of Ommadawn was released on Oldfield's compilation album Boxed.

In May 1977, the Liffey Light Orchestra performed the album live at Trinity College in Dublin. Oldfield did not tour until 1979; he started to perform excerpts from the album from 1980 onwards.

Paul Stump, in his 1997 History of Progressive Rock, said that "the technically and emotionally polymathic Ommadawn operates on several levels at once, not least because Oldfield states two themes rather than one near the beginning and doesn't try to develop them sequentially over fifty minutes but allows each its space to breathe and display itself, both singularly and with the other." He also praised the album's harmonics and greater economy of expression as compared to Oldfield's first two albums.

Excerpts from Ommadawn appeared in the NASA film The Space Movie (1979). A small portion of Part One was used as the theme to the children's TV show Jackanory on occasions when John Grant narrated his Littlenose stories.

Oldfield had initial ideas to make his later album Amarok (1990) as a sequel to Ommadawn, but the idea fell through. He did not revisit the idea until 2015 when he started recording a true sequel, Return to Ommadawn (2017).

2010 reissues 
In June 2010, Ommadawn was reissued as Deluxe Edition by Mercury Records as part of Oldfield's remastered album series for the label. The set includes a restored cover artwork, new stereo and 5.1 surround sound mixes completed by Oldfield and bonus material, including the early version of Part One that was scrapped and "In Dulci Jubilo", "First Excursion", "Argiers", and "Portsmouth".

Also in 2010, a limited edition 180-gram vinyl was released as a part of the Back to Black series. The digital edition contains the content from the two CDs of the Deluxe Edition. The Japanese release features the Super High Material CD format.

A limited edition box set of the album was also released in 2010, containing the Deluxe Edition set, a vinyl pressing, and a numbered and signed print of the artwork. The set saw 250 copies made and sold through Oldfield's official website.

Track listing 
All music by Mike Oldfield.

Personnel
Credits are adapted from the 1975 LP liner notes.

Musicians

Mike Oldfield – electric and acoustic guitars and basses (including 12-string guitar and classical guitar), mandolin, bouzouki, banjo, harp, spinet, grand piano, Farfisa & Lowrey organs, Solina string ensemble, ARP 2600 synthesizer, glockenspiel, bodhran, assorted percussion
Herbie (Christopher Herbert) – Northumbrian smallpipes
Leslie Penning – recorders, The Hereford City Band conductor
Terry Oldfield – panpipes
Pierre Moerlen – timpani
David Strange – cello
Don Blakeson – trumpet
Julian Bahula – African drums
Ernest Mothle – African drums
Lucky Ranku – African drums
Eddie Tatane – African drums
Clodagh Simonds – vocals
Bridget St John – vocals
Sally Oldfield – vocals
The Penrhos Kids (Abigail, Briony, Ivan, and Jason Griffiths) – vocals on "On Horseback"
The Hereford City Band – brass section
William Murray – percussion
Paddy Moloney – Uilleann pipes

Production
Mike Oldfield – producer, engineer
David Bailey – cover photographs
Phil Smee – CD package design (2010 remaster)

Certifications

References 

Mike Oldfield albums
1975 albums
Instrumental albums
Virgin Records albums